Maximilian (Max) Westermaier (6 May 1852, Kaufbeuren – 1 May 1903, Fribourg) was a German botanist.

He studied sciences at the University of Munich, where he was influenced by botanists Ludwig Radlkofer and  Carl Wilhelm von Nägeli. After graduation, he worked as an assistant to Simon Schwendener in Berlin, becoming privat-docent in 1879. In 1887 he relocated to Königsberg as a temporary replacement for the late Robert Caspary (1818–1887). Beginning in 1890, he taught classes at the gymnasium in Freising, Bavaria.

In 1896, with the support of Pope Leo XIII, he became the first professor of botany at the University of Fribourg, a position he maintained until his death in 1903. In 1898–99, he participated in a scientific expedition to Java, publishing Zur Entwickelung und Struktur einiger Pteridophyten aus Java ("Development and structure of some pteridophytes of Java", 1900) as a result of his research.

In 1893 he published Kompendium der allgemeinen Botanik für Hochschulen, a book that was later translated into English and published in 1896 as A compendium of general botany. Other noted works by Westermaier are Zur Embryologie der Phanerogamen, insbesondere über die sogenannten Antipoden ("The embryology of phanerogams, particularly in the so-called Antipodes", 1890). and Ueber gelenkartige einrichtungen an stammorganen (1901).

References 

1852 births
1903 deaths
19th-century German botanists
People from Kaufbeuren
Academic staff of the University of Fribourg